Squillo (also known as Call Girl) is a 1996 Italian giallo film directed by Carlo Vanzina.

Cast
Raz Degan as Inspector Tony Messina
Jennifer Driver as Maria
Paul Freeman as Marco
Bianca Koedam as Eva
Antonio Ballerio as Fabio
Alessandra Chiti as Sonja Rassimov
Pia Klover as Barbara
Luigi Montini as Superintendent Simoni
Yanai Degan as Salvatore
Caterina Rebracca as Rita
Cyrus Elias as the Hotel receptionist

References

External links

1996 films
Films directed by Carlo Vanzina
Giallo films
1990s Italian-language films
1990s Italian films